Terrance Quaites (born May 24, 1976), known professionally as TQ, is an American R&B singer. He is best known for his hit song "Westside", which became a top 40 hit in several countries in 1998.

Career

Music
TQ began his music career in the early 1990s with the R&B group Coming of Age, who had a hit with the ballad "Coming Home to Love".  After two album releases, Coming of Age in September 1993 and Comin' Correct in May 1995, the group went their separate ways.

The summer of 1998 saw TQ notch his first hit with "Westside". Later that year, on November 10, the album They Never Saw Me Coming was released, along with the single "Bye Bye Baby", and "Better Days", which followed the next year.

In 2000, TQ released his second album, The Second Coming. The album was never released in America but was released in other parts of the world. The UK release had a different track listing to the European release. Although the album was not released in America, the American version yet again had a different track listing. TQ eventually digitally released bonus tracks from the album in May 2008. This included songs missing from previous versions.

He recorded a hit song, "Let's Get Back to Bed – Boy!", with the German pop singer Sarah Connor, and starred with her in a music video in which they made love.

He left Sony and joined Cash Money Records around 2002. With them, he recorded various songs with artists such as Lil Wayne, Big Tymers, Hot Boys, and Baby. He also recorded his own album, Gemini, but it was never officially released. TQ released this himself via digital means on June 16, 2009.

He released a new album, Listen, in 2004. In 2007, TQ was featured on a single from the debut album of Iranian-Canadian rapper Imaan Faith.

TQ's song Paradise was released on April 29, 2008. This was followed by the Paradise album on June 30, 2009.

On March 23, 2009, TQ released the S.E.X.Y. EP on iTunes. It was made available on CD on June 30. The EP consists of previously unheard TQ material.

TQ released his next album, titled Kind of Blue, on March 23, 2010. TQ recorded the Michael Jackson song Dirty Diana for the album.

After a European tour in summer 2010, he co-wrote and recorded "Uh Oh", a pop duet with the British singer-songwriter, Danielle Senior. It was released April 2011. Remixes of "Uh Oh" included the classic soul version by CBKS.

On February 12, 2013, TQ released Legendary, as the follow-up album to Kind of Blue.

TQ released The BAEList – Vol 1 EP on January 12, 2016. It is aimed at his female fans.

TQ's album Coming Home was released on August 11, 2017.

Personal life
TQ was born in Mobile, Alabama, on May 24, 1976, but soon moved with his family to Compton, California. At the age of 16, he moved to Atlanta, Georgia. He has a sister. He has an older son, Rashaun, and a younger son, Tylon. Tylon has a YouTube channel.

Discography

Albums

Singles

Other songs and collaborations

Films

References

External links
Official website
Rockin' Meera Official Site
Richard III Official Site

Cash Money Records artists
American contemporary R&B singers
1976 births
Living people
Musicians from Compton, California
21st-century American singers